The Electronic City Elevated Expressway is a  long elevated highway from Silk Board junction to Electronic City in Bangalore, India. The project was is part of the BETL (Bengaluru Elevated Tollways Ltd), project as part of the National Highways Development Project and the Elevated Highways Project. It was initiated in early 2006, and was inaugurated on 22 January 2010. It starts from Roopena Agrahara after the Central Silk Board flyover and goes up to Electronic City.

The elevated expressway has helped to reduce the commute time to the tech hub of Electronic City greatly. 
The Bruhat Bengaluru Mahanagara Palike and Bangalore Development Authority had planned a series of flyovers and underpasses to make this arterial Hosur road signal free.

Exits

The Electronic City Elevated Expressway has 3 exits in Electronic City which were, one directing towards Electronic City Phase 1 on the right side with both upward and downward ramp, second one directing Electronic City Phase 2 on the left side with downward ramp and a straight third one directing towards Hosur on NH 44 with both upward and downward ramps.

References

Expressways in Karnataka
Roads in Bangalore